Art Blakey and the Jazz Messengers (stylized as Art Blakey!!!!! Jazz Messengers!!!!! and titled Alamode in Japan) is a studio album by Art Blakey and the Jazz Messengers, released on September 1, 1961, through Impulse! Records. Expanding to a sextet for the first time, it was the group's final recording with Bobby Timmons, who would be replaced by Cedar Walton.

Reception
In his DownBeat review of January 4, 1962, critic Ira Gitler commented: "This is a change of pace from most recent Messenger releases. There is only one original; the rest are standards that have not been overdone." AllMusic reviewer Steven McDonald described it as: "An absolutely wonderful 1961 set from Blakey and company, who demonstrate here how to be note-perfect without leeching away the emotion of a performance."

Track listing

 "À la Mode" (Curtis Fuller) — 6:40
 "Invitation" (Bronislau Kaper, Paul Francis Webster) — 7:25
 "Circus" (Lou Alter, Bob Russell) — 5:12
 "You Don't Know What Love Is" (Gene de Paul, Don Raye) — 6:55
 "I Hear a Rhapsody" (Jack Baker, George Fragos, Dick Gasparre) — 6:30
 "Gee Baby, Ain't I Good to You" (Andy Razaf, Don Redman) — 5:00

Personnel

 Art Blakey — drums
 Lee Morgan — trumpet
 Curtis Fuller — trombone
 Wayne Shorter — tenor saxophone
 Bobby Timmons — piano
 Jymie Merritt — bass

References 

1961 albums
Art Blakey albums
The Jazz Messengers albums
Impulse! Records albums
Albums produced by Bob Thiele
Albums recorded at Van Gelder Studio